

Winners and nominees

1980s

1990s

2000s

2010s

2020s

Records 
 Most awarded actress: Lucero and Angelique Boyer, 3 times.
 Most nominated actress: Leticia Calderón, Victoria Ruffo and Lucero with 6 nominations.
 Youngest winner: Angelique Boyer, 22 years old.
 Youngest nominee: Anahí, 18 years old.
 Oldest winner: Blanca Guerra, 56 years old.
 Oldest nominees: Jacqueline Andere, Victoria Ruffo and Rebecca Jones, 54 years old.
 Actresses with the most nominations without a win: Zuria Vega with 5 nominations.
 Actress winning after short time:
 Adela Noriega by (El manantial, 2002) and (Amor Real, 2004), 2 years difference.
 Maite Perroni by (Antes muerta que Lichita, 2016) and (Papá a toda madre, 2018), 2 years difference.
 Angelique Boyer by (Tres veces Ana, 2017) and (Amar a muerte, 2019), 2 years difference.
 Actress winning after long time: Angélica Aragón by (Vivir un poco, 1986) and (Mirada de mujer, 1998), 12 years difference.
 Actresses that winning the award for the same role:
 Christian Bach (Bodas de odio, 1983) and Adela Noriega (Amor Real, 2003)
 Lucero (Lazos de Amor, 1995) and Angelique Boyer (Tres veces Ana, 2016)
Actresses nominated for the same role without winning:
Lucía Méndez (Tú o nadie, 1985) and Jacqueline Bracamontes (Sortilegio, 2009).
Edith González (Monte calvario, 1986), Claudia Ramírez (Te sigo amando, 1996) and Ana Brenda Contreras (La que no podía amar, 2011).
Victoria Ruffo (Victoria, 1987) and Livia Brito (Muchacha italiana viene a casarse, 2014).
Leticia Calderón (Yo compro esa mujer, 1990) and Aracely Arámbula (Corazón Salvaje, 2010).
Leticia Calderón (Valeria y Maximiliano, 1991) and Jacqueline Bracamontes (Heridas de Amor, 2005).
Thalía (Marimar, 1994) and Ana Brenda Contreras (Corazón indomable, 2013).
Angélica Rivera (La dueña, 1995) and Lucero (Soy tu dueña, 2010).
Aracely Arámbula (Abrázame muy fuerte, 2000) and Zuria Vega (Que te perdone Dios, 2015).
Victoria Ruffo (Simplemente María, 1989) and Claudia Álvarez (Simplemente María, 2016).
 Actresses winning this category, despite having been as a main villain: Susana Alexander (La traición, 1985), Diana Bracho (Cadenas de amargura, 1991), Barbara Mori (Rubí, 2004) and Angelique Boyer (Teresa, 2010)
 Actress was nominated in this category, despite having played as a main villain: Lucero (Mañana es para siempre, 2010)
Foreign winning actresses:
 Christian Bach from Argentina
 Bárbara Mori from Uruguay
 Angelique Boyer from France

References

External links 
Esmas.com: TVyNovelas — at Televisa.
Univision.com: TVyNovelas Awards — at Univision.

Actress
Actress
Television awards for Best Actress
TVyNovelas Awards Actress